Marbachia (minor planet designation: 565 Marbachia) is a minor planet orbiting the Sun. It was named after the German city of Marbach on the river Neckar, birthplace of the writer Friedrich Schiller. This is classified as a D-type asteroid, although it displays a type of polarimetric behavior that is a characteristic of the "barbarians" class.

References

External links
 Lightcurve plot of (565) Marbachia, Antelope Hills Observatory
 
 

Background asteroids
Marbachia
Marbachia
S-type asteroids (Tholen)
19050509